David T. McNab  is a Métis historian. He is a professor at York University and cross-appointed in the departments of Equity Studies and Humanities in the Faculty of Liberal Arts and Professional Studies.  McNab works on Aboriginal land and treaty rights issues in Canada and as a claims advisor.

Education 
McNab has a Bachelor of Art (Honours) in History from Waterloo Lutheran University (now Wilfrid Laurier University.) A Master of Arts in History from McMaster University and a PhD from the University of Lancaster where he wrote his dissertation on the topic of "Herman Merivale and the British Empire, 1806-1874 : with special reference to British North America, Southern Africa and India."

Career 

McNab has published extensively on historical and contemporary issues related to Indigenous history, identity, land claims and governance, both in article and book form. His book "No Place for Fairness" provides an account of the history of Indigenous land claims in Ontario. He has worked as a claims advisor for a number of Indigenous groups and is an active consultant on a range of Indigenous issues. He was the Aboriginal Historical Consultant for TV Ontario on an hour long documentary on "Legend and Memory: Ontario First Nations", which aired March 29, 2002. This documentary was later nominated for a Gemini Award. He has also worked as a treaty and historical advisor for a number of communities, such as Bkejwanong First Nations, Mohawks of Akwesasne, and Algonquins of Golden Lake.

In 2017, McNab was elected a Fellow of the Royal Society of Canada.

Publications

References 

Métis writers
Academic staff of York University
20th-century Canadian historians
Living people
Writers from Ontario
Fellows of the Royal Society of Canada
1947 births
21st-century Canadian historians